The 2022 San Benedetto Tennis Cup was a professional tennis tournaments played on clay courts. It was the 16th edition of the tournament which was part of the 2022 ATP Challenger Tour. The event took place in San Benedetto del Tronto, Italy, from 25 to 31 July 2022.

Singles entrants

Seeds 

 1 Rankings as of 18 July 2022.

Other entrants 
The following players received wildcards into the singles main draw:
  Mattia Bellucci
  Gianmarco Ferrari
  Francesco Maestrelli

The following players received entry into the singles main draw as alternates:
  Matteo Gigante
  Lukáš Rosol
  Alexey Vatutin

The following players received entry from the qualifying draw:
  Pedro Boscardin Dias
  Raúl Brancaccio
  João Domingues
  Giovanni Fonio
  Camilo Ugo Carabelli
  Michael Vrbenský

The following players received entry as lucky losers:
  Andrey Chepelev
  Àlex Martí Pujolràs

Champions

Singles 

  Raúl Brancaccio def.  Andrea Vavassori 6–1, 6–1.

Doubles

  Vladyslav Manafov /  Oleg Prihodko def.  Fábián Marozsán /  Lukáš Rosol 4–6, 6–3, [12–10].

References

San Benedetto Tennis Cup
2022
2022 in Italian tennis
July 2022 sports events in Italy